Novoshakhtinsk is a mining city in Rostov Oblast, Russia, within 20 kilometres of the Dovzhansky border crossing to Ukraine.

History
It was established in 1939.

The population was: 

During the 2022 Russian Invasion of Ukraine, an oil refinery in the city was damaged and set ablaze in a targeted strike by a Ukrainian Mugin-5 Pro drone. Russian state media outlet TASS reported no casualties, and the resulting fire was extinguished. An unverified video of the drone strike recorded by Russian oil refinery workers began circulating on social media, which pro-Ukrainian activists used to mock the Russian air defense systems that failed to stop the drones. The video was also posted to the YouTube channel run by Ukraine’s land forces, who referred to the blaze as a “holy fire.”

Administrative and municipal status
Within the framework of administrative divisions, it is incorporated as Novoshakhtinsk Urban Okrug—an administrative unit with the status equal to that of the districts. As a municipal division, this administrative unit also has urban okrug status.

Notable residents 

Sergei Butenko (born 1960), football player and coach
Nicolai Dubinin (born 1973), Roman Catholic prelate

References

Notes

Sources

Cities and towns in Rostov Oblast